Tamara Mikhaylovna Gudima (5 June 1936 – 19 October 2021) was a Russian politician.

In 1959 she graduated from the Arkhangelsk State Pedagogical Institute and received the specialty of a teacher of the Russian language, literature and history. In 1972 she graduated from the Academy of Social Sciences under the Central Committee of the CPSU with a degree in Marxist-Leninist philosophy, after which she worked at the Arkhangelsk Forestry Institute until 1989. From 1989 to 1991 she served as secretary of the Arkhangelsk Regional Committee of the CPSU. A member of the Communist Party of the Russian Federation, she served in the State Duma from 1993 to 2000. Member of the Duma committee for culture.

Awards
Jubilee Medal "In Commemoration of the 100th Anniversary of the Birth of Vladimir Ilyich Lenin"
Medal "For Distinction in Guarding the State Border of the USSR"

References

1936 births
2021 deaths
Politicians from Arkhangelsk
Communist Party of the Soviet Union members
Communist Party of the Russian Federation members
First convocation members of the State Duma (Russian Federation)
Second convocation members of the State Duma (Russian Federation)
Third convocation members of the State Duma (Russian Federation)